Cantonment College, Jashore is a college located in Arabpur, Jashore, Bangladesh covering . Established in 1969, the college, which has 3500 students and 80 teachers, is regulated by the cantonment board and the Bangladesh Army.

History
The Directorate of Military Lands and Cantonments under Ministry of Defence established the college in 1969 as an extension of Dawood Public school. Later, in 1983 the college was relocated to the present campus.  A strong management headed by a high army official looks after the overall development of the college. Established in 1969 in the ‘Daud Public School And College’ campus with Humanities group only. Science group was opened in 1977. College was shifted to the present campus in 1983. Business Studies group was opened in 1985. BA, BSS. & B. Com pass courses were opened in 1993.

BSc. pass course was opened in 1995. Honor's courses in Economics, Political Science and Bangla were opened in 1996. Master's courses in the above subjects were opened in 1999.

Honor's courses in Accounting, Management, Mathematics, Social Work, Islamic History, Islamic Studies, and BBA were opened in 2004.

Academics
Jashore Cantonment College was certified as the best educational institution in National Education Week, 2002.

Higher secondary subjects include science, commerce and arts programmes; the college also offers Honours courses, including Bengali, social work, Islamic history, Islamic studies, accounting, management, BBA, and mathematics. College-level computer education was introduced in 1994. The computer department provides students with internet facilities. Science, humanities and business study streams are available at higher secondary level. BA, BSS & BSc courses are accessible at degree (pass) level. Moreover, degree (Honours) courses in Bangla, economics, political science, social work, Islamic history and culture, Islamic studies, accounting, management, mathematics, and business administration are also open here. Co-education is prevalent at all levels.

Facilities
Computer facilities

A well-facilitated computer lab is housed in a spacious room of the college. Every department is equipped with computer and internet facilities. Some classrooms have multimedia teaching facility.

Library facilities

A rich library is housed in a spacious room of the college. Students can
have their necessary books issued from here for a certain period. A good number of newspaper and magazines are kept in the library. Students can also read books, papers, and journals sitting in the library. Students of Honors classes can also go through different course-related and reference books form their respective seminars.

Hostel facilities
Now there are no hostel facilities under the college administration

Co-curricular activities 
Besides annual cultural program and prize giving ceremony, important days and occasions are celebrated. In addition, a week-long cultural competition and various game events are held as per schedule. Picnic for students of all levels is held in different groups.  Students from this college take part in different cultural and game competitions organized by government and non-government organizations at regional and national levels.

Every year on scheduled dates, a picnic of HSC 1st year and Honours classes are held along with the excursion of some HSC class. Even, every year the cultural week is held to find out the latent talent among the students on different Co-curricular activities. Year cultural Program is also held where the students of this college participate to make the event colorful.

Quizing

Students Participate in various competition. Jessore Cantonment is the champion of Inter Cantonment Quiz Competition 2013 & 2015.

Debating

Debating society, conduct regular debate competition. This college's debating team is the current runner-up of Inter cantonment parliamentary Debate Competition 2015. Students Participate in debates organized by Bangladesh Television, National Debate Council, Youth Development Directorate & Family planning Society and district administration on various occasions.

Publication of College Magazine & Wall Magazine

Every year with the spontaneous participation of teachers and students, college magazine is published. Not only that class wise wall magazines are also published by the students which help them flourish their power of literary writing.

Sports and Games

Every year different indoor and outdoor games are held around the year.

Outdoor Games :
 Football,
 Cricket
 Handball,
 Basketball,
 Volleyball,
 Athletics,
Indoor Games :
 Table tennis,
 Badminton,
 Chess,
 Karom Board.

References
 বোর্ড সেরা যশোর ক্যান্টনমেন্ট কলেজ - দৈনিক সমকাল (১৬ জুলাই, ২০১০)
 http://www.jcc.edu.bd/?page_id=48
 https://web.archive.org/web/20160304100706/http://www.campuslive24.com/campus.139930.live24/

Educational institutions established in 1969
1969 establishments in East Pakistan